Bainton railway station was a station on the Selby to Driffield Line. It opened on 1 May 1890 and served the village of Bainton. It closed on 20 September 1954.

History

Opened by the Scarborough Bridlington and West Riding Junction Railway, then run by the North Eastern Railway, it became part of the London and North Eastern Railway during the Grouping of 1923. The station then passed on to the Eastern Region of British Railways on nationalisation in 1948.

References

External links
 Bainton station on navigable O.S. map
 

Disused railway stations in the East Riding of Yorkshire
Former North Eastern Railway (UK) stations
Railway stations in Great Britain opened in 1890
Railway stations in Great Britain closed in 1954